The list of ship launches in 1700 includes a chronological list of some ships launched in 1700.


References

1700
Ship launches